A men's Twenty20 cricket tournament at the 2019 Pacific Games in Apia, Samoa, was held from 8 to 13 July 2019 at the Faleata Oval Grounds. Following the International Cricket Council's decision to grant T20I status to all matches played between Associate Members after 1 January 2019, matches were eligible for Twenty20 International (T20I) status subject to both teams being members of the ICC and players passing eligibility criteria.

The team's involved in the men's tournament were the host nation Samoa, Papua New Guinea, Vanuatu and New Caledonia. Tonga and the Cook Islands were originally included, but withdrew and were replaced by New Caledonia. Matches involving New Caledonia did not have T20I status as they were not an Associate Member of the ICC.

In the opening match of the tournament, 49-year old Ofisa Tonu'u played for Samoa against Papua New Guinea. Tonu'u had previously played rugby union for New Zealand in the 1990s.

Papua New Guinea topped the group stage after winning all six of their matches, and were joined in the gold medal match by Vanuatu who finished ahead of Samoa on net run rate. Papua New Guinea won the gold medal after defeating Vanuatu by 32 runs in the final.

Round-robin stage

Points table

Matches

Finals

Bronze medal match

Gold medal match

See also 
 Cricket at the 2019 Pacific Games – Women's tournament

References

External links
 Series home at ESPN Cricinfo

Pacific Games, men
Cricket at the 2019 Pacific Games
International cricket competitions in Samoa